Austral-American Productions was a short-lived film production company in Australia during the 1940s. They made two feature films during World War II, a time of low output for Australian cinema. They also produced some stage plays and exhibited films. Hartney Arthur was managing director.

The company was wound up in 1950.

Credits
A Yank in Australia (1942) – film
Twelfth Night and The Tempest by William Shakespeare (1943) – plays produced by John Alden
Red Sky at Morning (1944) – film

References

External links
Austral-American Productions at National Film and Sound Archive

Film production companies of Australia